Ellie Lust (born 17 September 1966) is a Dutch television presenter and former police officer and police spokesperson.

Career 

She presented three seasons of the television show Ellie op Patrouille in which she followed police forces in various countries. She also presented Ellie in de Handel which focused on illegal trade. She also appeared as police officer in the crime television show Opsporing Verzocht. In the summer of 2019, she interviewed guests as co-presenter in several episodes of the talk show Zomer met Art presented by Art Rooijakkers. In 2019, she also made the documentary Ellie aan de Verkeerde Kant, a documentary about hostile behavior against LGBT people and she reported the Pride Amsterdam live on television.

In 2016, she participated in the popular television show Wie is de Mol?. Both in later seasons of the show and in several appearances outside this show, she has become known for introducing the word etherdiscipline, which expresses the importance of clear communication when using walkie-talkies (which are regularly used in Wie is de Mol?). It has since also been used to refer to clear communication in general. In 2020, she appeared in a special anniversary edition of the show, called Wie is de Mol? Renaissance, which featured only contestants of previous seasons.

In 2021, she presented the television show Opgelicht? Hulp Online met Ellie Lust in which she looked at online fraud. She also appears in the television show 112 Vandaag which looks at interesting calls to the emergency phone number 112.

She appears in the film BOEIEN! directed by Bob Wilbers.

She also appeared in several episodes of the late night talk shows Laat op één, Pauw and Jinek.

Personal life 

She has a twin sister. She also has a brother.

Filmography

As presenter 

 2018 – 2020: Ellie op Patrouille
 2019: Zomer met Art
 2019: Ellie in de Handel
 2021: Opgelicht? Hulp Online met Ellie Lust
 2021: 112 Vandaag (as expert)

As actress 

 2022: BOEIEN!

As contestant 

 2016: Wie is de Mol?
 2020: Wie is de Mol? Renaissance (anniversary season)

Books 

 Ellie Lust, Mijn jaren bij de politie, Ambo/Anthos B.V., 2019

References

External links 

 
 

Living people
1966 births
Mass media people from Amsterdam
Dutch television presenters
Dutch women television presenters
Dutch police officers
Women police officers
21st-century Dutch women